Sagar Sangamey is a 1959 Bengali film directed by Debaki Bose. The film won the National Award for the Best Film and the Best Child Actress in 1959. The award was presented by the first President of IndiaDr Rajendra Prasad and the then Prime Minister Jawaharlal Nehru. It was screened at the 9th Berlin International Film Festival.

Cast
Bharati Debi
Manju Adhikary
Jahar Roy
Nitish Mukhopadhyay
Sailen Gangopadhyay
Tulsi Lahiri
Manorama Debi
Nibhanani Debi
Master Bibhu
Amar Pal
Md. Israel

Awards
National Film Awards
 1959National Film Award for Best Feature Film
 1959National Film Award for Best Feature Film in Bengali
 1959National Award for Best Child ActressManju Adhikari
Berlin International Film Festival
1959Golden BearNominated

References

External links

1959 films
1950s Bengali-language films
Bengali-language Indian films
Indian black-and-white films
Films directed by Debaki Bose
Best Feature Film National Film Award winners
Best Bengali Feature Film National Film Award winners